Kriss is a surname. Notable people with the surname include:

Eric Kriss, a musician, writer and business executive
Grigory Kriss, a Soviet Russian world champion épée fencer
Kriss Donald, a Scottish schoolboy, victim of a racially motivated murder
Kristina Kiss, a Canadian football (soccer) midfielder